The 2021–22 Spartan South Midlands Football League season was the 25th in the history of the Spartan South Midlands Football League, a football competition in England. The league operates three divisions, two of which are in covered in this article: the Premier Division at Step 5, and Division One at Step 6 of the English football league system.

The league constitution for this season was based on allocations for Steps 5 and 6 that were announced by The Football Association on 18 May 2021, and were subject to appeal.

After the abandonment of the 2019–20 and 2020–21 seasons due to the COVID-19 pandemic in England, numerous promotions were decided on a points per game basis over the previous two seasons.

Premier Division

At the end of the previous season, eight teams left the Premier Division:
 Biggleswade United, transferred to the United Counties League
 Colney Heath, promoted to Southern League Division One Central
 Edgware Town, transferred to the Combined Counties League
 Eynesbury Rovers, transferred to the United Counties League
 Newport Pagnell Town, transferred to the United Counties League
 North Greenford United, transferred to the Combined Countied League
 Potton United, transferred to the United Counties League
 Wembley, transferred to the Combined Counties League

The remaining 13 teams, together with the following, formed the Premier Division for 2021–22:
 Ardley United, transferred from the Hellenic League after appeal
 Flackwell Heath, transferred from the Hellenic League
 Hadley, transferred from the Essex Senior League
 Holmer Green, transferred from the Hellenic League
 Milton Keynes Irish, promoted from Division One
 New Salamis, promoted from Division One
 Risborough Rangers, promoted from the Hellenic League

Cockfosters, initially allocated to this division from the Essex Senior League, successfully appealed and the transfer was rescinded.

Premier Division table

Division One

At the end of the previous season, eight teams left Division One:
 Enfield Borough, transferred to the Combined Counties League
 Hillingdon Borough, transferred to the Combined Counties League
 London Lions, transferred to the Combined Counties League
 Milton Keynes Irish, promoted to the Premier Division
 New Salamis, promoted to the Premier Division
 Park View, transferred Eastern Counties League
 Rayners Lane, transferred to the Combined Counties League
 St Panteleimon, promoted to the Combined Counties League

The remaining nine teams, together with the following, formed Division One for 2021–22:
 Burton Park Wanderers, transferred from the United Counties League
 Irchester United, transferred from the United Counties League
 Kidlington Reserves, transferred from the Hellenic League
 Letchworth Garden City Eagles, promoted from the Hertfordshire Senior County League
 Long Crendon, transferred from the Hellenic League
 Northampton Sileby Rangers, transferred from the United Counties League
 Penn & Tylers Green, transferred from the Hellenic League
 Raunds Town, transferred from the United Counties League
 Rushden & Higham United, transferred from the United Counties League
 Thame Rangers, transferred from the Hellenic League
 Wellingborough Whitworth, transferred from the United Counties League

Division One table

Division Two

Division Two featured 13 clubs which competed in the division last season, along with three new club:
Milton Keynes College Football Academy
Eynesbury United, joined from the Cambridgeshire County League
Risborough Rangers Development, transferred from the Hellenic League Division Two North

Division Two table

Step 5 rankings
The 10 runners-up with the most points per game (PPG) at Step 5 were automatically promoted after the 2021–22 season. The remaining six played one-off inter-step play-off matches with the six third-from-bottom clubs with the fewest PPG from the eight divisions at Step 4. The winner of each match was promoted to Step 4 for the 2022–23 season, while each loser was relegated to Step 5.

The final points-per-game ranking of the second-placed teams was as follows:

The 12 best second-from-bottom clubs on a PPG basis out of 16 that were at Step 5 were reprieved from relegation. The four worst teams were relegated.

The final points-per-game ranking of the second-from-bottom-placed teams was also as follows:

References

2020-21
9